Josh Caterer (born April 12, 1972) is an American, Chicago-area musician, best known as the lead singer, lead guitarist, and principal songwriter of pop-punk band Smoking Popes, which he founded in 1991 with his older brother Matt and younger brother Eli.  Josh has also written and recorded Christian and gospel music as a solo artist and with the pop-punk band Duvall. In 2015, he founded the blues band Jackson Mud Band, which has released one full-length album called "Stranger Blues".

Early life
Josh Caterer grew up in Carpentersville, Illinois, where he attended Kings Road Elementary School and Carpentersville Middle School. Later, his family moved to Lake In The Hills IL, where he attended nearby H.D. Jacobs High School, graduating in 1990. After graduation, he held several menial jobs such as gas station cashier and machine operator at a plastics company.

Career
Smoking Popes formed in 1991 and began playing small local venues around the Chicago suburbs. Their first album Get Fired was released in 1993 by Chicago indie label Johann's Face Records. An opening spot for Green Day drew the attention of major labels, and in 1995 they signed to Capitol Records, which released their second album Born To Quit. The single from that album, "Need You Around", was included on the soundtrack to the hit movie Clueless and the band's career took off. They started touring North America and Europe as a headlining act, also opening for such artists as Cheap Trick, Goo Goo Dolls, Violent Femmes, Foo Fighters and Tripping Daisy. During the making of their third album Destination Failure, Josh began struggling with substance abuse and went through a period of personal upheaval and spiritual searching. His songwriting, which until then had focused mostly on the ups and downs of romantic love, began to take on a deeper and more profound quality, which is reflected in the lyrics on that album. Destination Failure was released in 1997 to critical acclaim, but achieved only moderate commercial success.

Eventually, after a collapse due to a cocaine overdose at an all-night party his spiritual search intensified, and reading C.S. Lewis's Mere Christianity helped lead him to embrace Christianity in 1998. Shortly after his conversion, the Smoking Popes broke up, and Caterer became heavily involved in his church, also working at World Relief, a charitable, non-profit organization. He released a five-song EP of acoustic gospel music called Why Me. In 2001 he returned to the rock scene, founding the Christian rock band Duvall, which included other former members of the Smoking Popes.

In November 2005, the Smoking Popes reunited for a sell-out show at the Chicago club The Metro. They embarked on a U.S. tour in early 2006 with the band Bayside and released a new album called Stay Down in July 2008.

Since then, Smoking Popes have released two more full-length albums, This Is Only A Test in 2011 and Into The Agony in 2018. In October 2020, Josh played a virtual concert at the Hideout in Chicago, which was later released as a live solo album called The Hideout Sessions.

Church musician
From 2011 to 2015, Josh served as director of worship at the Village Church of Barrington, Illinois, then from 2015 to 2019 as Pastor of Worship and Music Ministries at Calvary Memorial Church in Oak Park, Illinois. Since July 2019, he's been serving as Pastor of Worship at Village Bible Church in Sugar Grove Illinois.

Personal life
Josh lives in Aurora, Illinois with his wife, Stefanie, and their two children, Elliot and Phoebe.

References

External links
Interview with Josh Caterer by Harvest Bible Chapel

Josh Caterer playing at North Central College Union:
I Know You Love Me
Megan

1972 births
Living people
American punk rock guitarists
American male singer-songwriters
American punk rock singers
Singers from Chicago
American rock songwriters
Smoking Popes members
Guitarists from Chicago
American male guitarists
21st-century American singers
Singer-songwriters from Illinois